Mynydd Drws-y-Coed is a peak on the Nantlle Ridge in Snowdonia, north Wales. It is located at the easterly end of the ridge, and is a subsidiary summit of Trum y Ddysgl. It has steep west-facing cliffs, the summit area being the highest point on a thin ridge.

The west side is very rocky and airy, and some scrambling is needed to attain the summit. A good head for heights will also be needed on the exposed regions.

References

Mountains and hills of Gwynedd
Mountains and hills of Snowdonia
Hewitts of Wales
Nuttalls